Stojiljković is a Serbian surname that may refer to
Aleksandar Stojiljković (born 1990), Serbian football midfielder
Georgina Stojiljković (born 1988), Serbian fashion model 
Goran Stojiljković (disambiguation), multiple people 
Nikola Stojiljković (born 1992), Serbian football striker
Vlajko Stojiljković (1937–2002), Yugoslavia's Minister of Internal Affairs
Vlastimir Đuza Stojiljković (1929–2015), Serbian actor and singer
Georgina Stojiljković (born 1988), Serbian fashion model

Serbian surnames
Slavic-language surnames
Patronymic surnames